The Très Court International Film Festival (the Très Court, formerly the International Festival of Very Shorts) is a film festival which takes place annually in June in multiple cities simultaneously. It is dedicated to short films that are no longer than four minutes. Each year, around 2 000 international short films are screened in competition and of those around 140, or 7% are screened at the festival, of which a much smaller number will be awarded one of the various awards available that year.

The event is held in over 20 countries. In 2018, 30,000 people attended the Festival, including 10,000 in France.

History 

The International Festival of Very Shorts was created in 1999 by Marc Bati and Pascal Toutain. The Festival was originally dedicated to films that were no longer than 3 minutes.

The first edition took place in Paris, France at the Forum des Images in October 1999.

From 2002 onward, the Festival was implemented in other cities in France. In 2005, the Festival reached an international audience, as screenings were organized in Switzerland and Belgium.

In 2009, the Women's Words program was created by Katia Martin Maresco.

The Festival was renamed in 2014 and became the Très Court International Film Festival.

The French program was created in 2018.

Organization of the Festival

International coordination is managed from Paris by the Tout en Très Court organization.

The Festival is backed by multiple public agencies and private companies, such as the Ministry of Women's Rights, the Centre national du cinéma et de l'image animée and Canal+.

Program 
In Competition :
  (International cinema)
  (Films centred around women)
Out of competition :
  (Children's films)
  (French cinema)
  (Provocative and subversive films)
Former programs : 
  (Music videos) from 2014 to 2017
  (Films about disabilities) from 2012 to 2017
  (Episodes from webseries) in 2016
  (Films that depict a societal change) in 2012

Awards

  Awarded to the best short in the International competition
  Awarded to the most original short in the International competition
  Awarded to the best animation short in the International competition
  Awarded to the best short in the Women's Words competition
  Awarded after all the attendees voted for their favorite short film

Participating countries
Africa : Egypt, Togo
Americas :  Canada, Chile, Ecuador, Panama, Peru, Martinique
Asia : China, India
Europe : England, Estonia, France, Greece, Ireland, Iceland, Italy, Netherlands, Romania, Slovakia, Spain, Switzerland, Turkey 
Oceania : New Caledonia

The jury presidents

Each year, a president is chosen to chair the jury of the official selection of the festival.
1999 : Moebius, cartoonist 
2000 : Charlélie Couture, singer 
2001 : Patrick Bouchitey, director 
2002 : Gustave Parking, comedian 
2003 : Jean-Michel Ribes, director 
2004 : Emma de Caunes, actress 
2005 : Pierre Richard, comedian 
2006 : Gerard Krawczyk, director 
2007 : Claude Chabrol, director 
2008 : Yves Boisset, director 
2009 : Jean-Loup Hubert, director 
2010 : Philippe Muyl, director 
2011 : Nicolas Altmayer, producer 
2012 : Jean-François Halin, writer
2013 : Marianne Slot, producer
2014 : Bruno Putzulu, comedian
2015 : Pascale Ferran, director
2016 : Aure Atika, comedian
2017 : Nicolas Boukhrief, director
2018 : Éric Judor, comedian
2019 : Michel Hazanavicius, director

References

External links

Short film festivals
Film festivals held in multiple countries
Film festivals established in 1999
1999 establishments in France